The 1919 Santa Clara Missionites football team was an American football team that represented Santa Clara University as an independent during the 1919 college football season.

The team was led by first-year coach Robert E. Harmon. Harmon had played football at Illinois College, University of Denver, and Creighton University, and had then coached teams at All Hallows College (Salt Lake City), Gonzaga University, Davis Farm (now known as UC-Davis), and Illinois College.

Schedule

References

Santa Clara
Santa Clara Broncos football seasons
Santa Clara Missionites football